Old Irish, also called Old Gaelic (Ogham script: ᚌᚑᚔᚇᚓᚂᚉ; ; ;  or ), is the oldest form of the Goidelic/Gaelic language for which there are extensive written texts. It was used from  600 to  900 CE. The main contemporary texts are dated  700–850 CE; by 900 the language had already transitioned into early Middle Irish. Some Old Irish texts date from the 10th century, although these are presumably copies of texts written at an earlier time. Old Irish is thus forebear to Modern Irish, Manx, and Scottish Gaelic.

Old Irish is known for having a particularly complex system of morphology and especially of allomorphy (more or less unpredictable variations in stems and suffixes in differing circumstances) as well as a complex sound system involving grammatically significant consonant mutations to the initial consonant of a word. Apparently, neither characteristic was present in the preceding Primitive Irish period, though initial mutations likely existed in a non-grammaticalized form in the prehistoric era. Much of the complex allomorphy was subsequently lost, but the sound system has been maintained with little change in the modern languages.

Contemporary Old Irish scholarship is still greatly influenced by the works of a small number of scholars active in the late 19th and early 20th centuries such as Rudolf Thurneysen (1857–1940) and Osborn Bergin (1873–1950).

Notable characteristics
Notable characteristics of Old Irish compared with other old Indo-European languages, are:
 Initial mutations, including lenition, nasalisation and aspiration/gemination.
 A complex system of verbal allomorphy.
 A system of conjugated prepositions that is unusual in Indo-European languages but common to Celtic languages. There is a great deal of allomorphy here, as well.
 Infixed object prepositions, which are inserted between the verb stem and its prefix(es). If a verb lacks any prefixes, a dummy prefix is normally added.
 Special verbal conjugations are used to signal the beginning of a relative clause.

Old Irish also preserves most aspects of the complicated Proto-Indo-European (PIE) system of morphology. Nouns and adjectives are declined in three genders (masculine, feminine, neuter); three numbers (singular, dual, plural); and five cases (nominative, vocative, accusative, dative and genitive). Most PIE noun stem classes are maintained (o-, yo-, ā-, yā-, i-, u-, r-, n-, s-, and consonant stems). Most of the complexities of PIE verbal conjugation are also maintained, and there are new complexities introduced by various sound changes (see below).

Classification
Old Irish was the only member of the Goidelic branch of the Celtic languages, which is, in turn, a subfamily of the wider Indo-European language family that also includes the Slavonic, Italic/Romance, Indo-Aryan and Germanic subfamilies, along with several others. Old Irish is the ancestor of all modern Goidelic languages: Modern Irish, Scottish Gaelic and Manx.

A still older form of Irish is known as Primitive Irish. Fragments of Primitive Irish, mainly personal names, are known from inscriptions on stone written in the Ogham alphabet. The inscriptions date from about the 4th to the 6th centuries. Primitive Irish appears to have been very close to Common Celtic, the ancestor of all Celtic languages, and it had a lot of the characteristics of other archaic Indo-European languages.

Sources
Relatively little survives in the way of strictly contemporary sources. They are represented mainly by shorter or longer glosses on the margins or between the lines of religious Latin manuscripts, most of them preserved in monasteries in Germany, Italy, Switzerland, France and Austria, having been taken there by early Irish missionaries. Whereas in Ireland, many of the older manuscripts appear to have been worn out through extended and heavy use, their counterparts on the Continent were much less prone to the same risk because once they ceased to be understood, they were rarely consulted.

The earliest Old Irish passages may be the transcripts found in the Cambrai Homily, which is thought to belong to the early 8th century. The Book of Armagh contains texts from the early 9th century. Important Continental collections of glosses from the 8th and 9th century include the Würzburg Glosses (mainly) on the Pauline Epistles, the Milan Glosses on a commentary to the Psalms and the St Gall Glosses on Priscian's Grammar.

Further examples are found at Karlsruhe (Germany), Paris (France), Milan, Florence and Turin (Italy). A late 9th-century manuscript from the abbey of Reichenau, now in St. Paul in Carinthia (Austria), contains a spell and four Old Irish poems. The Liber Hymnorum and the Stowe Missal date from about 900 to 1050.

In addition to contemporary witnesses, the vast majority of Old Irish texts are attested in manuscripts of a variety of later dates. Manuscripts of the later Middle Irish period, such as the Lebor na hUidre and the Book of Leinster, contain texts which are thought to derive from written exemplars in Old Irish now lost and retain enough of their original form to merit classification as Old Irish.

The preservation of certain linguistic forms current in the Old Irish period may provide reason to assume that an Old Irish original directly or indirectly underlies the transmitted text or texts.

Phonology

Consonants
The consonant inventory of Old Irish is shown in the chart below. The complexity of Old Irish phonology is from a four-way split of phonemes inherited from Primitive Irish, with both a fortis–lenis and a "broad–slender" (velarised vs. palatalised) distinction arising from historical changes. The sounds  are the broad lenis equivalents of broad fortis ; likewise for the slender (palatalised) equivalents.

{| class="wikitable" style="text-align: center;"
! colspan="2" |
! Labial
! Dental
! Alveolar
! Velar
! Glottal
|-
! rowspan="2" | Nasal
! 
| 
| colspan="2" | 
| 
|
|-
! 
| 
| colspan="2" | 
| 
|
|-
! rowspan="2" | Plosive
! 
| 
| colspan="2" | 
| 
|
|-
! 
| 
| colspan="2" | 
| 
|
|-
! rowspan="2" | Fricative
! 
| 
| 
| 
| 
| 
|-
! 
| 
| 
| 
| 
| 
|-
! rowspan="2" | Nasalized fricative
! 
| 
|
|
|
|
|-
! 
| 
|
|
|
|
|-
! rowspan="2" | Approximant
! 
|
| colspan="2" | 
|
|
|-
! 
|
| colspan="2" | 
|
|
|-
! rowspan="2" | Lateral
! 
|
| colspan="2"| 
|
|
|-
! 
|
| colspan="2" | 
|
|
|}

The precise articulation of the fortis sonorants  is unknown, but they were probably longer, tenser and generally more strongly articulated than their lenis counterparts , as in the Modern Irish and Scottish dialects that still possess a four-way distinction in the coronal nasals and laterals.  and  may have been pronounced  and  respectively.

Vowels
Old Irish had distinctive vowel length in both monophthongs and diphthongs. Short diphthongs were monomoraic, taking up the same amount of time as short vowels, while long diphthongs were bimoraic, the same as long vowels. (This is much like the situation in Old English but different from Ancient Greek whose shorter and longer diphthongs were bimoraic and trimoraic, respectively:  vs. .) The inventory of Old Irish long vowels changed significantly over the Old Irish period, but the short vowels changed much less.

The following short vowels existed:

{| class="wikitable" style="text-align: center;"
!
! colspan="2" | Monophthongs
! colspan="2" | Diphthongs
|-
!Close
| 
| 
| 
|
|-
!Mid
| 
| 
| 
| 1
|-
!Open
| colspan="2" align="center" | , (?)
| colspan="2" align="center" | 
|}

1The short diphthong  likely existed very early in the Old Irish period, but merged with /u/ later on and in many instances was replaced with /o/ due to paradigmatic levelling. It is attested once in the phrase  by the prima manus of the Würzburg Glosses.

 arose from the u-infection of stressed  by a  that preceded a palatalized consonant. This vowel faced much inconsistency in spelling, often detectable by a word containing it being variably spelled with au, ai, e, i, or u across attestations.  "hill, mound" is the most commonly cited example of this vowel, with the spelling of its inflections including tulach itself, telaig, telocho, tilchaib, taulich and tailaig. This special vowel also ran rampant in many words starting with the stressed prefix air- (from Proto-Celtic *ɸare).

Archaic Old Irish (before about 750) had the following inventory of long vowels:

{|class="wikitable"
!
! colspan="2" | Monophthongs
! colspan="2" | Diphthongs
|-
! Close
| 
| 
| 
| 
|-
! Mid
| 1
| , (?)2
| 
| ,3
|-
! Open
| colspan="2" | 
| colspan="2" | 3
|}

They are clearly distinguished in later Old Irish, in which  becomes ía (but é before a palatal consonant).  becomes é in all circumstances. Furthermore,  is subject to u-affection, becoming éu or íu, while  is not.

However, in later Old Irish both sounds appear usually as úa, sometimes as ó, and it is unclear whether  existed as a separate sound any time in the Old Irish period.

3 existed only in early archaic Old Irish (700 or earlier); afterwards it merged into . Neither sound occurred before another consonant, and both sounds became ó in later Old Irish (often ú or u before another vowel). The late ó does not develop into úa, suggesting that áu > ó postdated ó > úa.

Later Old Irish had the following inventory of long vowels:

{| class="wikitable" style="text-align: center;"
!
! colspan="2" | Monophthongs
! colspan="2" | Diphthongs
|-
! Close
| 
| 
| 
| 
|-
! Mid
| 
| 
| 
| 1
|-
! Open
| colspan="2" | 
| colspan="2" |
|}

1Early Old Irish  and  merged in later Old Irish. It is unclear what the resulting sound was, as scribes continued to use both aí and oí to indicate the merged sound.

The distribution of short vowels in unstressed syllables is a little complicated. All short vowels may appear in absolutely final position (at the very end of a word) after both broad and slender consonants. All ten possibilities are shown in the following examples:

{| class="wikitable"
|-
! Old Irish
! Pronunciation
! English
! Annotations
|-
| 
| 
| kill
| 1 sg. subj.
|-
| 
| 
| leave
| 1 sg. subj.
|-
| 
| 
| kill
| 2 sg. subj.
|-
| 
| 
| leave
| 2 sg. subj.
|-
| 
|  (?)
| kill
| 2 sg. indic.
|-
| 
| 
| leave
| 2 sg. indic.
|-
| 
| 
| eye
| gen.
|-
| 
| 
| door
| gen.
|-
| 
| 
| kill
| 1 sg. indic.
|-
| 
| 
| leave
| 1 sg. indic.
|}

The distribution of short vowels in unstressed syllables, other than when absolutely final, was quite restricted. The phoneme  tended to occur when the following syllable contained an *ū in Proto-Celtic (for example,    "law" (dat.) < PC *dligedū), or after a broad labial (for example,   "book"; domun  "world"). The phoneme  occurred in other circumstances. The occurrence of the two phonemes was generally unrelated to the nature of the corresponding Proto-Celtic vowel, which could be any monophthong: long or short.

Long vowels also occur in unstressed syllables. However, they rarely reflect Proto-Celtic long vowels, which were shortened prior to the deletion (syncope) of inner syllables. Rather, they originate in one of the following ways:
from the late resolution of a hiatus of two adjacent vowels (usually as a result of loss of *s between vowels);
from compensatory lengthening in response to loss of a consonant (cenél "kindred, gender" < *cenethl; du·air-chér "I have purchased" < *-chechr, preterite of crenaid "buys");
from assimilation of an unstressed vowel to a corresponding long stressed vowel;
from late compounding;
from lengthening of short vowels before unlenited , still in progress in Old Irish (compare erríndem "highest" vs. rind "peak").

Stress
Stress is generally on the first syllable of a word. However, in verbs it occurs on the second syllable when the first syllable is a clitic (the verbal prefix as- in as·beir  "he says"). In such cases, the unstressed prefix is indicated in grammatical works with a following centre dot (·).

Orthography 

As with most medieval languages, the orthography of Old Irish is not fixed, so the following statements are to be taken as generalisations only. Individual manuscripts may vary greatly from these guidelines.

The Old Irish alphabet consists of the following eighteen letters of the Latin alphabet:
 a, b, c, d, e, f, g, h, i, l, m, n, o, p, r, s, t, u,
in addition to the five long vowels, shown by an acute accent (´):
 á, é, í, ó, ú,
the lenited consonants denoted with a superdot (◌̇):
 ḟ, ṡ,
and the eclipsis consonants also denoted with a superdot:
 ṁ, ṅ.
Old Irish digraphs include the lenition consonants:
 ch, fh, th, ph, sh,
the eclipsis consonants:
 mb, nd, ng; ṁb, ṅd, ṅg,
the geminatives:
 bb, cc, ll, mm, nn, pp, rr, tt,
and the diphthongs:
 aé/áe/aí/ái, oé/óe/oí/ói,
 uí, ía, áu, úa, éu, óu, iu, au, eu,
 ai, ei, oi, ui; ái, éi, ói, úi.

The following table indicates the broad pronunciation of various consonant letters in various environments:

{| class="wikitable" style="text-align: center;"
|-
!colspan=6|Broad consonant phonemes
|-
!rowspan=2|Letter
!colspan=3|Word-initial
!colspan=2|Non-initial
|-
!unmutated
!eclipsed
!lenited
!single
!geminate
|-
|b
| 
|  
| colspan=2|
|  
|-
|c
| 
| 
|  
| , 
|  
|-
|d
| 
|  
| colspan=2|
| —
|-
|f
| 
| 
|  
| 
| —
|-
|g
| 
|  
| colspan=2|
| —
|-
|h
| colspan=5|See explanation below
|-
|l
| 
| —
| colspan=2|
|  
|-
|m
| 
| —
| colspan=2|
|  
|-
|n
| 
| —
| colspan=2|
|  
|-
|p
| 
| 
|  
| , 
|  
|-
|r
| 
| —
| colspan=2|
|  
|-
|s₁
| 
| —
|  
| 
| —
|-
|s₂1
| 
| —
| colspan=2|  
| —
|-
|t
| 
| 
|  
| , 
|  
|}

Generally, geminating a consonant ensures its unmutated sound. While the letter  may be voiced  at the end of some words, but when it's written double  it's always voiceless  in regularised texts; however, even final  was often written "cc", as in bec / becc "small, little" (Modern Irish and Scottish beag, Manx beg).

The slender (palatalised) variants of the 13 consonants are denoted with  marking the letter. They occur in the following environments:
 Before a written e, é, i, í
 After a written i, when not followed by a vowel letter (but not after the diphthongs aí, oí, uí)

Although Old Irish has both a sound  and a letter h, there is no consistent relationship between the two. Vowel-initial words are sometimes written with an unpronounced h, especially if they are very short (the Old Irish preposition  "in" was sometimes written ) or if they need to be emphasised (the name of Ireland, was sometimes written ). On the other hand, words that begin with the sound  are usually written without it:   "her gold". If the sound and the spelling co-occur, it is by coincidence, as   "it is not".

Stops following vowels 

The voiceless stops of Old Irish are c, p, t. They contrast with the voiced stops g, b, d. Additionally, the letter m can behave similarly to a stop following vowels. These seven consonants often mutate when not in the word-initial position.

Ambiguity in these letters' pronunciations arises when a single consonant follows an l, n, or r.
{| class="wikitable"
|-
|-
!Old Irish
!Pronunciation
!English
|-
|
| 
| 
|-
| or 
| 
| 
|-
| or 
| 
| 
|-
|
| 
| 
|-
| or 
| 
| 
|-
|-
|
| 
| 
|-
|
| 
| 
|-
|
| 
| 
|}

{| class="wikitable"
|-
|-
!Old Irish
!Pronunciation
!English
|-
|
| 
| 
|-
|
| 
| 
|-
|
| 
| 
|-
|
| 
| 
|-
|
| 
| 
|}

In cases in which it becomes a stop, m is often written double to avoid ambiguity.
{| class="wikitable"
|-
!colspan=3|Non-initial consonant 
|-
!Old Irish
!Pronunciation
!English
|-
|
| 
| 
|-
| or 
| 
| 
|}

Stops following other consonants 

Ambiguity arises in the pronunciation of the stop consonants (c, g, t, d, p, b) when they follow l, n, or r:
{| class="wikitable"
|-
|-
!Old Irish
!Pronunciation
!English
|-
|
| 
| 
|-
|
| 
| 
|-
|
| 
| 
|-
|
| 
| 
|-
|
| 
| 
|-
|
| 
| 
|}

After m, the letter b is naturally a stop . After d, l, r, the letter b is fricative :
{| class="wikitable"
|-
!colspan=3|Consonant 
|-
!Old Irish
!Pronunciation
!English
|-
|
| 
| 
|-
|
| 
|  (in a tree)
|-
|
| 
| 
|-
|
| 
| 
|}

After n or r, the letter d is a stop :
{| class="wikitable"
|-
!colspan=3|Consonant 
|-
!Old Irish
!Pronunciation
!English
|-
|
| 
| 
|-
|
| 
| 
|}

After n, l, or r, the letter g is usually a stop , but it becomes a fricative  in a few words:
{| class="wikitable"
|-
!colspan=3|Consonant 
|-
!Old Irish
!Pronunciation
!English
|-
|
| 
| 
|-
| or 
| 
| 
|-
| or 
| 
| 
|-
|
| 
| 
|-
|
| 
| 
|-
|
| 
| 
|}

The consonants l, n, r 

The letters l, n, r are generally written double when they indicate tense sonorants and single when they indicate lax sonorants. Originally, it reflected an actual difference between single and geminate consonants, as tense sonorants in many positions (such as between vowels or word-finally) developed from geminates. As the gemination was lost, the use of written double consonants was repurposed to indicate tense sonorants. Doubly written consonants of this sort do not occur in positions where tense sonorants developed from non-geminated Proto-Celtic sonorants (such as word-initially or before a consonant).
{| class="wikitable"
|-
!Old Irish
!Pronunciation
!English
|-
|
| 
| 
|-
|
| 
| 
|-
|
| 
| 
|-
|
| 
| 
|-
|
| 
| 
|-
|
| 
| 
|-
|
| 
| 
|-
|
| 
| 
|}

Geminate consonants appear to have existed since the beginning of the Old Irish period, but they were simplified by the end, as is generally reflected by the spelling. Eventually, however, ll, mm, nn, rr were repurposed to indicate nonlenited variants of those sounds in certain positions.

Vowels 

Written vowels a, ai, e, i in poststressed syllables (except when absolutely word-final) all seem to represent phonemic . The particular vowel that appears is determined by the quality (broad vs. slender) of the surrounding consonants and has no relation to the etymological vowel quality:
{|class="wikitable"
! Preceding consonant !! Following consonant !! Spelling !! Example
|-
| broad || broad ||  ||   "vengeance" (nom.)
|-
| broad || slender (in open syllable) ||  ||
|-
| broad || slender (in closed syllable) ||  ||   "vengeance" (acc./dat.)
|-
| slender || broad ||  ||   "law" (acc.)
|-
| slender || slender ||  ||   "law" (gen.)
|}

History 

Old Irish underwent extensive phonological changes from Proto-Celtic in both consonants and vowels. Final syllables were lost or transphonologized as grammatical mutations on the following word. In addition, unstressed syllables faced various reductions and deletions of their vowels.

Grammar

Old Irish is a fusional, nominative-accusative, and VSO language.

Nouns decline for 5 cases: nominative, accusative, genitive, prepositional, vocative; 3 genders: masculine, feminine, neuter; 3 numbers: singular, dual, plural. Adjectives agree with nouns in case, gender, and number. The prepositional case is called the dative by convention.

Verbs conjugate for 3 tenses: past, present, future; 3 aspects: simple, perfective, imperfective; 4 moods: indicative, subjunctive, conditional, imperative; 2 voices: active, and passive; independent, and dependent forms; and simple, and complex forms. Verbs display tense, aspect, mood, voice, and sometimes portmanteau forms through suffixes, or stem vowel changes for the former four. Direct object personal pronouns are infixed between the preverb and the verbal stem. Verbs agree with their subject in person and number. A single verb can stand as an entire sentence. Emphatic particles such as -sa and -se are affixed to the end of the verb.

Prepositions inflect for person and number, and different prepositions govern different cases, sometimes depending on the semantics intended.

See also
Early Irish literature
Dictionary of the Irish Language
Auraicept na n-Éces
Goidelic substrate hypothesis

Notes

References

Bibliography

External links

An Etymological Dictionary of the Gaelic Language MacBain, Alexander Gairm Publications, 1982
Old Irish dictionary 
 Old Irish Online by Patrizia de Bernardo Stempel and Jonathan Slocum, free online lessons at the Linguistics Research Center at the University of Texas at Austin
eDIL (digital edition of the Dictionary of the Irish Language)
 glottothèque - Ancient Indo-European Grammars online, an online collection of introductory videos to Ancient Indo-European languages produced by the University of Göttingen

 
Languages attested from the 8th century
Medieval Ireland
Irish, 1
Culture of medieval Scotland